As-Salih Salah ad-Din Salih ibn Muhammad ibn Qalawun (28 September 1337–1360/61, better known as as-Salih Salih, was the Mamluk sultan in 1351–1354. He was the eighth son of Sultan an-Nasir Muhammad to accede to the sultanate. He was largely a figurehead, with real power held by the senior Mamluk emirs, most prominently Emir Taz an-Nasiri (com).

Biography
Salih was born on 28 September 1337. He was the son of Sultan an-Nasir Muhammad (r. 1310–1341) and one of his wives, Qutlumalik, the daughter of Emir Tankiz al-Husami of Damascus (r. 1312–1340). As sultan, Salih often displayed public affection and respect for his mother. He took his mother and his wives on a trip to Siryaqus (a resort village north of Cairo), along with several emirs and other officials. There, he held a royal ceremony in honor of his mother in which he laid out her table and served her food that he personally prepared. He declared her honorary sultan, accorded her regalia and assigned her servants and slave girls to play the role of her emirs.

In August 1351, Salih was appointed as sultan in place of his half-brother an-Nasir Hasan. His installment in the sultanate was a result of a decision by the senior Mamluk emirs, namely Taz and Baybugha in response to an-Nasir Hasan's move to assert real control over the state. At the onset of Salih's reign, emirs Shaykhu and Manjak (com) (Baybugha's brother) were released. In effect, Emir Taz was the ruler of the sultanate and Salih was a figurehead sultan. However, Salih did assert his authority when Emir Baybugha launched a rebellion in Syria in 1352. Salih led his army to Damascus and confronted the rebels. Baybugha and the nuwwab (governors, sing. na'ib) of Safad, Hama and Tripoli were ultimately imprisoned, and Byabugha died while incarcerated in Aleppo later that year.

Emir Shaykhu fell out with Salih and at the same time conspired with Emir Sirghitmish to oust Emir Taz from power. In October 1354, the dissident emirs toppled Salih and restored an-Nasir Hasan to power, while sending Taz to Aleppo to serve as that province's na'ib (effectively exiling him). Salih died in December 1360 at the age of 24. He was buried in the mausoleum of his paternal grandmother, Umm Salih (wife of Qalawun) in Cairo. He was survived by his son, Muhammad.

References

Bibliography

 

1337 births
1360 deaths
14th-century Mamluk sultans
Bahri sultans
14th-century Kipchaks